Albert Walton Kenner (December 15, 1889 – November 12, 1959) was a decorated United States Army Medical Corps major general who served in World War I and World War II. During World War II, he was a Chief medical officer for Operation Torch and Operation Overlord.

Early life and World War I

Albert Walton Kenner was born on December 15, 1889, in Holyoke, Massachusetts. In his youth, his family moved to Virginia, where he grew up. He attended an Emerson Institute and subsequently George Washington University, where he earned his M.D. in 1915. He was a member of Phi Sigma Kappa fraternity while at George Washington.

Kenner joined the Army in 1916 and served during Pancho Villa Expedition. During World War I, Kenner sailed to France with the American Expeditionary Force, where he served as a medical officer in the 26th Infantry Regiment of the 1st Infantry Division.

During the heavy fighting at Soissons in World War I, the regimental commander, Colonel Hamilton A. Smith, was mortally wounded. Kenner voluntarily went to the front lines under heavy machine-gun fire in the hope of helping him. Finding Colonel Smith was deceased, he recovered his Smith's body and returned to his own lines. For this action, Kenner was decorated for gallantry with the Distinguished Service Cross (DSC).

In addition to his DSC, he received three Silver Stars, one Purple Heart, one French Croix de guerre 1914–1918 with Palm, and one Legion of Honour, in World War I.

Retirement

Major general Kenner retired on June 30, 1949, and stayed in Washington, D.C., area with his wife, Raymonde Minard Kenner (1896–1959) until his death on November 12, 1959, at the age of 69 years. On April 16, 1962, the army hospital at Fort Lee, Virginia (now Kenner Army Health Clinic) was named in his honor.

Military awards 

Kenner's military decorations and awards:

Distinguished Service Cross citation

Kenner's DSC citation reads:

General Orders: War Department, General Orders No. 15 (1919)
Action Date: 22-July-1918
Name: Albert Walton Kenner
Service: Army
Rank: Major
Regiment: 26th Infantry Regiment (Attached)
Division: 1st Division, American Expeditionary Forces

Citation: The President of the United States of America, authorized by Act of Congress, July 9, 1918, takes pleasure in presenting the Distinguished Service Cross to Major (Medical Corps) Albert W. Kenner, United States Army, for extraordinary heroism in action while serving with 26th Infantry Regiment (Attached), 1st Division, A.E.F., near Soissons, France, 22 July 1918. Learning that his regimental commander had been mortally wounded, Major Kenner voluntarily went through machine-gun fire beyond the front lines in the hope of helping him. Finding his colonel dead, he recovered the body, in spite of the danger to which such action subjected him.

References

External links
Generals of World War II

1889 births
1959 deaths
People from Holyoke, Massachusetts
George Washington University School of Medicine & Health Sciences alumni
United States Army personnel of World War I
United States Army generals
United States Army Medical Corps officers
Burials at Arlington National Cemetery
Recipients of the Distinguished Service Cross (United States)
Recipients of the Distinguished Service Medal (US Army)
Recipients of the Silver Star
Recipients of the Legion of Merit
Officiers of the Légion d'honneur
Recipients of the Croix de Guerre 1914–1918 (France)
Knights of the Order of the Crown (Belgium)
Recipients of the Croix de guerre (Belgium)
United States Army generals of World War II